Jeni may refer to
 Jeni Barnett
 Jeni Bojilova-Pateva
 Jeni Couzyn
 Jeni Klugman
 Jeni Le Gon
 Jeni Mawter
 Jeni Mundy
 Jeni Tennison

See also
 Jennifer (given name)